HD 231701 b is an extrasolar planet approximately 356 light years away in the constellation of Sagitta. This planet orbits at 0.55 AU from the star HD 231701 with eccentricity 0.19. Based on its high mass of 1.08 MJ, the planet is probably a gas giant, meaning the planet has no solid surface and have composition similar to Solar System's outer planets.

The planet HD 231701 b is named Babylonia. The name was selected in the NameExoWorlds campaign by Iraq, during the 100th anniversary of the IAU. Babylonia was a key kingdom in ancient Mesopotamia from the 18th to 6th centuries BC.

References

External links
 

Sagitta (constellation)
Exoplanets discovered in 2007
Giant planets
Exoplanets detected by radial velocity
Exoplanets with proper names